Nhà Bè is a township of Nhà Bè District, Ho Chi Minh City, Vietnam.

References

Populated places in Ho Chi Minh City
Townships in Vietnam